Candelaria is a department of the province of Misiones (Argentina).

See also
Mártires, Misiones

References 

Departments of Misiones Province